Emmanuel Episcopal Church is a historic Carpenter Gothic church located on Main Street in Eastsound on Orcas Island, Washington. On December 12, 1994, it was added to the National Register of Historic Places.

National Register listing
Emmanuel Episcopal Church (added 1994 - Building - #94001431)
Main St., Eastsound
Historic Significance: 	Event
Area of Significance: 	Exploration/Settlement
Period of Significance: 	1875–1899, 1900–1924
Owner: 	Private
Historic Function: 	Religion
Historic Sub-function: 	Religious Structure
Current Function: 	Religion
Current Sub-function: 	Religious Structure

Current use
The church is still functioning.

See also

List of Registered Historic Places in Washington

References

External links
 Emmanuel Episcopal Parish website

Churches on the National Register of Historic Places in Washington (state)
Episcopal churches in Washington (state)
Buildings and structures in San Juan County, Washington
Carpenter Gothic church buildings in Washington (state)
National Register of Historic Places in San Juan County, Washington